Controversy is the disagreement and disapproval of or about someone or something. It typically occurs when criticism is prolonged and public.

Controversy may also refer to:

 Controversy (Prince album), a 1981 album by Prince
 "Controversy" (song), a 1981 single by Prince from the album of the same name
"Controversy (Live in Hawaii)", a 2004 digital single by Prince
 Controversy (Willie D album), a 1989 album by Willie D
 Controversy, an album by Skull Duggery
 Controversy (magazine), British magazine published from 1932 to 1950

See also
 Case or Controversy Clause in United States law
 Controversies about Opus Dei
 Scientology controversy